Shanti Narayan Naik was an Indian politician and member of the Janata Party. Naik was a first term member of the Maharashtra Legislative Assembly in 1978 from the  Shivajinagar constituency assembly constituency in Pune.

References 

Politicians from Pune
Janata Party politicians
Members of the Maharashtra Legislative Assembly
Marathi politicians